The Tromøy Bridge is a suspension bridge that crosses the Tromøysundet strait in the municipality of Arendal in Agder county, Norway.

The bridge is part of Norwegian County Road 409 and it opened on 21 October 1961 by Trygve Bratteli, the Minister of Transport and Communications. The bridge originally cost . In 2008, the annual average daily traffic was 8,350 cars per day.

Its building was prepared by a special committee which was chaired by Christian Stray during its entire existence from 1938 to 1961.

See also
List of bridges in Norway
List of bridges in Norway by length
List of bridges by length

References

Bridges in Agder
Bridges completed in 1961
Buildings and structures in Arendal